Kiglon F.C. is a Chitungwiza-based football club, that got promoted from Zimbabwean Second Division to the top level Zimbabwe Premier Soccer League in 2008.

References

Chitungwiza
Football clubs in Zimbabwe
2004 establishments in Zimbabwe